The Yūshio class was a Japanese diesel-electric submarine class operated by the JMSDF. Ten were built under the fourth defense plan in 1975 fiscal year. A training submarine, was retired on March 7, 2008.

Boats

Gallery

References 
 Jane's Fighting Ships 2005–2006

Submarine classes